Most Zoos in Canada are committed to education, science and conservation.

For aquariums, see List of aquaria in Canada.

Alberta
Calgary Zoo - Calgary
Edmonton Valley Zoo - Edmonton

British Columbia
British Columbia Wildlife Park - Kamloops
Greater Vancouver Zoo - Aldergrove
Victoria Bug Zoo - Victoria
Victoria Butterfly Gardens - Brentwood Bay

Manitoba
Assiniboine Park Zoo - Winnipeg

New Brunswick
Magnetic Hill Zoo - Moncton

Nova Scotia
Oaklawn Farm Zoo - Aylesford
Shubenacadie Wildlife Park - Shubenacadie

Ontario
African Lion Safari - Hamilton
Bird Kingdom - Niagara Falls
Twin Valley Nature Park - Brant
Elmvale Jungle Zoo - Elmvale
Greenview Aviaries Park & Zoo - Chatham-Kent, Ontario
High Park Zoo - Toronto
Indian River Reptile and Dinosaur Park - Indian River
Jungle Cat World - Orono
Oshawa Zoo and Fun Farm - Oshawa
Papanack Park Zoo - Wendover
Reptilia (zoo) - Vaughan and Whitby
Riverdale Farm - Toronto
Riverview Park & Zoo - Peterborough
Saunders Country Critters - Kemptville
Safari Niagara - Stevensville
Toronto Zoo - Toronto
 Turda Farms - Mono 
West Perth Animal Park - Mitchell

Quebec
Granby Zoo - Granby
Zoo de Falardeau - Saint-David-de-Falardeau 
Familizoo - Saint-Calixte
Ecomuseum Zoo - Montreal
Montreal Biodome - Montreal
Montreal Insectarium - Montreal
Parc Safari - Hemmingford
Zoo Sauvage de St-Félicien - Saint-Félicien
Miller Zoo - Frampton

Saskatchewan
Forestry Farm Park and Zoo, Saskatoon

Closed

British Columbia 

 Okanagan Game Farm - Kaleden (opened 1967, closed 1999)
 Stanley Park Zoo - Stanley Park (closed 1994)

New Brunswick 

 Cherry Brook Zoo - Saint John (opened 1974, closed 2020)

Nova Scotia 

 Downs' Zoological Gardens - Fairview (closed 1872)
 Maritime Reptile Zoo - Dartmouth (opened in 2012, closed 2014)
 Upper Clements Wildlife Park - Upper Clements (closed 2007)

Ontario 

 Bowmanville Zoo - Clarington (opened 1919, closed in 2016)

Quebec 

 Jardin Zoologique du Québec - Quebec City (opened 1931, closed 2006)

See also 
List of CAZA member zoos and aquariums
List of WAZA member zoos and aquariums
List of zoos

References

 
Zoos
Canada
Zoos